The Little Gangster is a 1990 French drama film directed by Jacques Doillon. It was entered into the 41st Berlin International Film Festival where it won an Honourable Mention.

Cast

References

External links

1990 drama films
1990 films
1990s French-language films
Films directed by Jacques Doillon
Films scored by Philippe Sarde
French drama films
Louis Delluc Prize winners
1990s French films